Elloree is a town in Orangeburg County, South Carolina, United States. The population was 692 at the 2010 census.

History
Trinity Lutheran Church was added to the National Register of Historic Places in 2008.

Geography
Elloree is located at  (33.5321, -80.5718). The town is located along the overlap of South Carolina Highway 6 and South Carolina Highway 267 at the northern terminus of South Carolina Highway 47. 

Demographics

2020 census

As of the 2020 United States census, there were 570 people, 264 households, and 144 families residing in the town.

2000 census
As of the census of 2000, there were 742 people, 340 households, and 199 families residing in the town. The population density was 772.3 people per square mile (298.4/km2). There were 381 housing units at an average density of 396.5 per square mile (153.2/km2). The racial makeup of the town was 55.66% White, 43.94% African American, 0.13% Native American, and 0.27% from two or more races. Hispanic or Latino of any race were 0.13% of the population.

There were 340 households, out of which 21.2% had children under the age of 18 living with them, 37.6% were married couples living together, 17.4% had a female householder with no husband present, and 41.2% were non-families. 37.9% of all households were made up of individuals, and 23.5% had someone living alone who was 65 years of age or older. The average household size was 2.18 and the average family size was 2.89.

In the town, the population was spread out, with 20.6% under the age of 18, 7.8% from 18 to 24, 22.4% from 25 to 44, 24.8% from 45 to 64, and 24.4% who were 65 years of age or older. The median age was 45 years. For every 100 females, there were 77.5 males. For every 100 females age 18 and over, there were 71.7 males.

The median income for a household in the town was $22,574, and the median income for a family was $35,380. Males had a median income of $26,838 versus $21,641 for females. The per capita income for the town was $21,711. About 12.3% of families and 21.1% of the population were below the poverty line, including 33.3% of those under age 18 and 14.6% of those age 65 or over.

Education
Elloree has a public library, a branch of the Orangeburg County Library.

Notable people
Chris Antley, champion American jockey
William H. Brandenburg, retired Major General
James Hampton, outsider artist who created the Throne of the Third Heaven of the Nations' Millennium General Assembly

References

External links
 

Towns in Orangeburg County, South Carolina
Towns in South Carolina